Worlds Beyond was an American digest magazine of science fiction and fantasy fiction in 1950 and 1951. The magazine only issued three monthly issues, from December 1950 to February 1951, but is notable for having printed stories by Cyril M. Kornbluth, Jack Vance, Mack Reynolds, Graham Greene, John Christopher, Lester del Rey, Judith Merril, and others.

Worlds Beyond was published by Hillman Periodicals and was edited by Damon Knight. The cover price was 25 cents and each edition had 128 pages.

The first two issues of the magazine were styled Worlds Beyond Science-Fantasy Fiction. In its final issue, it was styled Worlds Beyond: A Magazine of Science-Fantasy Fiction.

References

Sources

1950 establishments in the United States
1951 disestablishments in the United States
Monthly magazines published in the United States
Defunct science fiction magazines published in the United States
Defunct digests
Fantasy fiction magazines
Magazines established in 1950
Magazines disestablished in 1951
Science fiction digests
Science fiction magazines established in the 1950s